Bardufoss is a town and commercial centre in Målselv Municipality in Troms og Finnmark county, Norway. The three villages of Andselv, Andslimoen, and Heggelia together form the Bardufoss area. Bardufoss is located in the Målselvdalen valley near the confluence of the Barduelva and Målselva rivers. Bardufoss Airport is located here.

Military

Bardufoss has a civilian and military airport, Bardufoss Air Station, suitable for landing bomber aircraft, fighter jets such as F-16s, and other heavy planes. Bardufoss was also the home of the Norwegian Army's 6th division (dissolved in 2009).

There is a street in Bardufoss that is named General Fleischers Veg in honour of Carl Gustav Fleischer.

The airport was renamed Snowman International on 19 March 2011 by a Norwegian Minister after a commercial flight landed from Manchester, England, to join the celebrations.

Nature
Bardufoss is covered in flora. The natural forest is mostly made up of Downy birch, Scots pine, aspen and Grey alder. However, Norway spruce has been planted in plantations since the middle part of the 20th century for economic reasons (timber). Bardufoss and its airport are used as settings in the TV drama Outlier (2020).

Climate
Although not far from the coast, Bardufoss and Målselvdalen is known for a somewhat more continental climate, and hence, colder winters (but with less humidity and little wind) compared to the coastal areas. There is a very reliable snow cover in winter, while summer days often are warmer than in Tromsø.

There is on average 93 days each winter with daily low  or colder, and 28 days with low  or colder. The winter season sees on average 68 days with at least  snow cover on the ground, 126 days with at least  snow cover, and 179 days with at least  snow cover. In the warm season there is on average 116 days per year when the daily average high reaches  or warmer and 22 days with daily average high above . Precipitation is fairly moderate, there is on average 75 days each year with at least  precipitation and 15 days per year with at least  precipitation. This is based on data from Met.no with 1971-2000 as base period.

Recent years have seen warming. Six of the monthly record highs are from after 2000. The November record low is from 2019.

References

External links

SAS: About Bardufoss
Exercise Cold Response
yr.no: Weather and climate statistics for Bardufoss

Målselv
Populated places of Arctic Norway
Villages in Troms